My Sister Eileen is an American situation comedy broadcast during the 1960–1961 television season. It depicts the lives of two sisters, one a writer and the other an actress, who move to New York City to further their careers.

Premise

My Sister Eileen focuses on Ruth and Eileen Sherwood, sisters from Ohio who moved to New York City to pursue their respective careers. Ruth, the more serious and more sensible of the two, aspires to be a writer, while the younger and more attractive Eileen dreams of achieving success as an actress. The two women find an apartment in a Greenwich Village brownstone owned by Mr. Appopoplous and befriend reporter Chick Adams. Ruth accepts a job with publisher D. X. Beaumont and becomes close with her co-worker Bertha. However, the better part of her time is spent supervising Eileen, who has a tendency to fall for every con artist and potential boyfriend who crosses her path while her agent Marty Scott struggles to find her auditions.

Cast

 Elaine Stritch as Ruth Sherwood
 Anne Helm as Eileen Sherwood (pilot episode)
 Shirley Bonne as Eileen Sherwood (all other episodes)
 Jack Weston as Chick Adams
 Rose Marie as Bertha
 Raymond Bailey as D. X. Beaumont
 Stubby Kaye as Marty Scott
 Leon Belasco as Mr. Appopoplous
 Agnes Moorehead as Aunt Harriet (recurring)

Among the guest stars were John Banner, Bert Convy, Anne Helm, Jo Morrow, Richard Webb, and Dick Wesson.

Production
My Sister Eileen was based on a series of autobiographical short stories by Ruth McKenney originally published in The New Yorker and then published in book form in 1938, as well as the 1940 play and 1942 and 1955 film adaptations which the stories inspired.

Broadcast history

The pilot for My Sister Eileen aired on May 16, 1960, as an episode of Alcoa-Goodyear Theater entitled "You Should See My Sister." Anne Helm portrayed Eileen in this episode.

In addition to the pilot, 26 episodes — all with Shirley Bonne portraying Eileen — were produced for My Sister Eileen′s run as a regular series on CBS. The series premiered on October 5, 1960, and was broadcast at 9:00 p.m. Eastern Time and Pacific Time throughout its run. It aired opposite Hawaiian Eye on ABC and Perry Como's Kraft Music Hall on NBC.The final new episode aired on April 12, 1961.

Episodes
SOURCESThe Evening Review (East Liverpool, Ohio), October 12, 1960, p. 28The Tribune (Scranton, Pennsylvania), October 19, 1960, p. 19The Tribune (Scranton, Pennsylvania), October 26, 1960, p. 9"Television Highlights," The Schenectady Gazette, November 2, 1960, p. 23.The Record (Hackensack, New Jersey), November 9, 1960, p. 100"Television Highlights," The Schenectady Gazette, November 23, 1960, p. 19.The Times (San Mateo, California), December 7, 1960, p. 27"Television Highlights," The Schenectady Gazette, December 21, 1960, p. 29.El Paso Herald-Post (El Paso, Texas), January 4, 1961, p. 14.Democrat and Chronicle (Rochester, New York), January 11, 1961, p. 18.The Times (San Mateo, California), January 25, 1961, p. 24.Pittsburgh Post-Gazette (Pittsburgh, Pennsylvania), February 8, 1961, p. 33.Des Moines Tribune (Des Moines, Iowa), February 15, 1961, p. 17."Television Highlights," The Schenectady Gazette, February 22, 1961, p. 24."Television Highlights," The Schenectady Gazette, March 8, 1961, p. 22."Television Highlights," The Schenectady Gazette, March 22, 1961, p. 23.Democrat and Chronicle (Rochester, New York), March 29, 1961, p. 45.

References

 Brooks, Tim and Marsh, Earle, The Complete Directory to Prime Time Network TV Shows 1946 - Present. New York: Ballantine Books 1988. , pp. 544, 902

External links

 
 My Sister Eileen opening credits on YouTube
 My Sister Eileen episode "The Photography Mix-Up" (original black-and-white) on YouTube
 My Sister Eileen episode "The Photography Mix-Up" (colorized) on YouTube

1960 American television series debuts
1961 American television series endings
1960s American sitcoms
Black-and-white American television shows
CBS original programming
English-language television shows
Live action television shows based on films
Television series based on plays
Television series about sisters
Television series by Screen Gems
Television shows set in New York City